Jaime Chik Mei-chun (born 5 January 1962) is a Hong Kong TVB actress and was named as one of the Five Beauties of TVB.

Personal life
Chik met Hong Kong actor Michael Miu in 1981 while shooting for the TVB television drama You Only Live Twice. The couple married in 1990 and since have two children: daughter Phoebe Miu (born 1991) and son Murphy Miu (born 1993).

Filmography

External links
 
 

1962 births
Living people
Hong Kong film actresses
Hong Kong television actresses
20th-century Hong Kong actresses
21st-century Hong Kong actresses